Diouloulou Arrondissement  was an arrondissement of the Bignona Department in the Ziguinchor Region of Senegal. It was renamed Kataba Arrondissement when 
Diouloulou was upgraded to an urban commune in 2008.

Subdivisions
The arrondissement was divided administratively into 3 rural communities and in turn into villages.

Arrondissement of Diouloulou